Mid Tyrone may refer to:

The central part of County Tyrone
Mid Tyrone (Northern Ireland Parliament constituency)
Mid Tyrone (UK Parliament constituency)